March Construction Ltd v Christchurch City Council (1995) 6 TCLR 394 is a cited case that in general, silence does not constitute misrepresentation in contract.

Background
March Construction tendered for some work from the Christchurch City Council. However, in their tender, their employee entered into their calculations, a sum of $72.75, when they should have used $727.50. This resulted in the unit price being quoted as $250, instead of $968.

After the council had accepted March's tender, the mistake was discovered by March, and they subsequently sought relief from the court, claiming that the council's silence on the mistake constituted misrepresentation.

Held
The court refused relief, stating the council had no legal obligation to point out to March that they had made a mistake in their tender price.

References

New Zealand contract case law
1995 in New Zealand law
High Court of New Zealand cases
1995 in case law
1990s in Christchurch